Stephen Park (born August 23, 1967) is an American former professional stock car racing driver. He won races in NASCAR's two top Northeast touring series (Modified and K&N East) and all three national divisions (Truck, Busch, Cup Series). Park was born in East Northport, New York as the youngest of four sons.

Park began racing not in an entry-level class, but in NASCAR Modifieds on Long Island of longtime National Modified Championship contender Bob Park. After establishing himself in weekly Modified racing at Riverhead Raceway, he advanced to the Featherlite Modified Series. He won several races and became a championship contender before moving on to the Busch Series.

He won twice in NASCAR's highest division, but injuries derailed his Cup Series career.

NASCAR career

1996–1997
Park was first hired by seven-time Winston Cup Champion Dale Earnhardt in 1996. Initially, Park refused to return Dale's phone messages, who was calling with interest to hire Park, thinking his friends were pranking him. However, after finally being convinced that the real Dale Earnhardt was calling him, Park made one start in the No. 31 Busch Series (now known as the Xfinity Series) car in Charlotte in October that resulted in a 29th-place finish. Park was then given a full-time ride in Earnhardt's No. 3 AC-Delco-sponsored car for the 1997 season. Throughout the season, Park posted three wins at Nashville, Michigan, and Richmond, walking away with Rookie of the Year honors with a third-place finish in the final points standings.

1997–1999
Park came to the Winston Cup Series (now known as NASCAR Cup Series) as the driver for the No. 14 team of Dale Earnhardt Inc. (DEI) in 1997. He attempted eight races in this car, qualifying for four of them. He also ran a race in the No. 40 car at Martinsville Speedway for Felix Sabates. In the 1998 season, Park switched to the No. 1 Chevrolet for DEI and drove the first two races, but he failed to qualify at the third race of the year at Las Vegas. During practice for the fourth event of the year at Atlanta, Park suffered a tire failure and had three hard hits before his car came to rest. He sustained a broken leg, broken collarbone, broken shoulder blade, and two chipped front teeth. Park returned later in the year at Indianapolis and ran the rest of the year. He posted a best finish of 11th at Michigan and Dover.

In 1999, his first of only two full Winston Cup seasons, Park finished 30 of 34 races. He went out with handling problems during the Daytona 500 and Charlotte, an engine failure at the other Daytona race, and a crash at Sears Point. In the Sears Point crash, Park spun around in turn two and backed into an embankment, thrusting his car up into the air and over onto the top of a tire barrier. Park posted a best finish of sixth in the Kmart 400 at Michigan and finished 14th in the point standings.

2000–2001

During the 2000 NASCAR Winston Cup Series, Park would grab his first win at his home track of Watkins Glen, winning the 2000 Global Crossing @ The Glen and finish 11th in the point standings.

Park's 2001 season began with a crash in lap 173 of the Daytona 500, in which he was one of eighteen cars involved. He was unhurt and had led for several laps prior to the crash, which itself was overshadowed by his employer Dale Earnhardt's fatal crash on the last lap. The following week, Park scored an emotional win for DEI by winning the Dura Lube 400 at North Carolina Speedway. He also competed in the Busch Series that season, but on September 1, he was injured in a crash at Darlington Raceway while driving the No. 31 Chevrolet for Marsh Racing. While under caution, his steering wheel came off, causing him to yank a hard left. At the same time, Larry Foyt was speeding up to join the front for the restart, and he rammed the driver side of Park's car. Park was hospitalized with a brain injury and several broken ribs, and suffered double vision and slurred speech. Foyt said that his car was traveling "well over 100 miles per hour." The incident marked the beginning of Park's struggles to get back into NASCAR's upper divisions.

2002–2003
Park missed the first four races in 2002, but he returned to race at the fifth race of the year at Darlington. He had many accidents, however. The largest incident was a flip at Pocono Raceway. During the first lap, Park tried to get to the outside of Rusty Wallace but Wallace tried to block Steve and he put Wallace in the wall. Park turned left to avoid where he spun into and was turned by his teammate Dale Earnhardt Jr. Jr's car got under Park and Park hit the infield barrier with tremendous velocity, causing him to flip over. Fortunately, neither drivers were injured and Park and Jr. walked with each other to the waiting ambulance to the infield care center. The race had a 65-minute red flag to repair the old-fashioned guardrail highway barrier that Park hit. The barriers were replaced afterwards.

During the 2003 NASCAR Winston Cup Series, Dale Earnhardt, Inc. let Park go midway into the season, and he was effectively "traded" to Richard Childress Racing for Jeff Green, who took over the No. 1 car from Park with Park taking over the No. 30 car for Childress. A few days later, he won the pole for the Winston All Star Open, but at the start of the race he jumped the start and had to start from the rear. He never made it to the next round. His best finish at RCR was a 5th-place finish at Michigan that June, as he fought then teammate Robby Gordon for that position.

2004–2005
At the end of the 2003 season, Park announced he would not return to the No. 30 car and would join the Craftsman Truck Series the following season. He joined Las Vegas-owned team Orleans Racing and piloted the No. 62 truck, vacated by Brendan Gaughan who was offered a ride in the No. 77 Nextel Cup car for Penske Racing. Although Park never won a race in 2004, he finished 9th in CTS driver points, and was voted Most Popular Driver by his peers.

In 2005 Park won the Craftsman Truck Series American Racing Wheels 200, the second race of the season at California Speedway, and became the tenth driver to win a race in all three of NASCAR's top racing series (one of seven drivers to accomplish the feat in the 2005 season alone). However, Park and the team struggled the rest of the season, and in October, right before the truck race in Martinsville, Park and Orleans Racing parted ways due to Dodge pulling support and money to many truck teams.

2008–2010

In 2008 Park signed with NDS Motorsports and drove the No. 35 Monte Carlo in all 13 of the NASCAR Camping World East Series events. He finished 9th in the standings with his best finish being second place at New Hampshire Motor Speedway.

In 2009 Park returned to race in the No. 35 Monte Carlo in the NASCAR Camping World East Series. He finished 5th in the point standings. Park made a single start in the Chevy for Corrie Stott Racing in the series, starting 31st and finishing 25th. On August 1, 2009, he won the Edge Hotel 150 at Adirondack International Speedway. It was his first East Series win since July 1, 1996 at Nazareth Speedway.

In 2010 Park returned again to race in the East Series. Park also drove the numbers 46 and 41 Vandyk Baler Corp/ Bollegraaf Toyotas in the NASCAR Camping World Truck Series for Eddie Sharp Racing in 2010 for three races (two in the 41 and one in the 46), with a best finish of 18th at Chicagoland Speedway.

Park returned to the Sprint Cup Series in July 2010, driving the No. 36 Chevrolet for Tommy Baldwin Racing. In his first Sprint Cup Series race in several years, Park started the Coke Zero 400 at Daytona from the 39th position, as qualifying was rained out. He went on to finish 13th and led one lap. Park's fan-sponsored car was painted to honor Richie Evans, a nine-time NASCAR Modified champion who was killed in a racing accident shortly after winning his final championship in 1985.

2011
Park ran one race for Tommy Baldwin Racing at Talladega, however he retired from the race after completing only four laps. He also attempted the Sylvania 300 at New Hampshire Motor Speedway later that year, but he failed to qualify. The fan-sponsored New Hampshire car was intended to honor six-time Modified Series champion owner Len Boehler. He also ran two races on the NASCAR Southern Modified Tour, finishing fifth at Connecticut's Thompson Speedway and twelfth at Charlotte.

Post-NASCAR
In October 2012, Park spoke to ESPN in support of IMPACT (Immediate Post-Concussion Assessment and Cognitive Testing) and other neurological testing for drivers in the wake of his former teammate Dale Earnhardt Jr. being sidelined after sustaining a concussion at Talladega. Park himself was a victim of crashes that took him out of action.

Return to NASCAR (2013)
Park entered a Whelen Modified Tour race during Speedweeks at Daytona. The race was run as part of the inaugural UNOH Battle at the Beach to open Daytona's new backstretch .4 mile short-oval configuration.

On the final lap Park was pushed from behind by Eric Goodale into race leader Mike Stefanik and inadvertently wound up winning the race. It was Park's first modified racing victory since 1996. Stefanik was visibly upset with the incident, calling it "just bullshit".

Personal life
In late 2008, Park was married to longtime girlfriend, Jessica Skarpalezos at Sea Island, Georgia. On January 2, 2010, Park announced on his website the birth of his son Jayden Robert Park.

Park became acquainted with Mariah Carey in high school through mutual friends as they both grew up in the same area.

Park owns and operates a Batteries Plus Bulbs franchise in Mooresville, North Carolina.

Park sold his Batteries Plus Bulbs franchise in Mooresville, North Carolina in September 2022.

Park was inducted into the Suffolk Sports Hall of Fame on Long Island in the Auto Racing Category with the Class of 2004.

Motorsports career results

NASCAR
(key) (Bold – Pole position awarded by qualifying time. Italics – Pole position earned by points standings or practice time. * – Most laps led. ** – All laps led.)

Sprint Cup Series

Daytona 500

Busch Series

Camping World Truck Series

K&N Pro Series East

Camping World West Series

Whelen Modified Tour

Whelen Southern Modified Tour

ARCA Racing Series
(key) (Bold – Pole position awarded by qualifying time. Italics – Pole position earned by points standings or practice time. * – Most laps led.)

References

External links
 
 

Living people
1967 births
People from East Northport, New York
Racing drivers from New York (state)
NASCAR drivers
Dale Earnhardt Inc. drivers
Richard Childress Racing drivers
Sportspeople from Suffolk County, New York